Mithun is another name for the gayal.

Mithun, Midhun or Mithen or Mrithun can also refer to:

Organisations
Mithun, Inc, an American integrated design firm
Mithun Agency, an American advertising agency

People

Given name
Mithun Ali (born 1990), Bangladeshi cricketer
Mithun Chakraborty (born 1950), Hindi movie actor
Mithun Chowdhury (born 1989), Bangladeshi footballer 
Mithun Manhas (born 1979), Indian cricketer
Mithun Tejaswi, Indian actor
DJ Mithun, Bangladeshi DJ / Music Composer

Surname
Anthony Mithen
Laurie Mithen
Marianne Mithun (born 1946), scholar of American Indian languages
Steven Mithen

Other
 Mithun, one of the names of the Hindu god Krishna
 Mithuna (month), a month in Hindu calendars.

See also
 Maithuna, the Sanskrit term for sexual union